In Vodou, the Boum'ba Maza are a group of powerful spirits or deities known as loa.

References

Haitian Vodou gods